The Hayes River is a river in far northern British Columbia, Canada, flowing into Teslin Lake from the west, just to the west of the entry into that lake of the Teslin River.  Other rivers feeding Teslin Lake include the Jennings River and the Swift River.

See also
List of rivers in British Columbia

References

Cassiar Country
Rivers of British Columbia